Gordy is a 1994 American family comedy-drama film directed by Mark Lewis, about a livestock piglet named Gordy who searches for his missing family (who are taken away to a slaughterhouse in Omaha, Nebraska). He experiences the lives of others who are part of the film's side plots, including traveling country music singers Luke McAllister and his daughter, Jinnie Sue; and lonely boy Hanky Royce whose mother, Jessica, is engaged to a sinister businessman named Gilbert Sipes. Gordy changes lives for the people he encounters due to their ability to understand him. The film was distributed by Miramax Films under their Miramax Family Films imprint.

The film features the song "Pig Power in the House" by Tag Team. A music video was produced for the song, featuring clips from the film.

Plot 

A piglet named Gordy lives a happy life on Meadow Brook Farm somewhere near Hope, Arkansas. However, after the farmer goes bankrupt, he is forced to sell everything, starting with Gordy's family. Two men arrive in a truck to take Gordy's father, but Gordy is alerted of this by Richard, the rooster of the farm. He tries to stop his father from leaving by following the truck taking him, but he tells him to go home and look after his family. When he returns he finds that they were taken in another truck while he pursued his father. Determined to locate them and return to the farm, he sets out alone to find them. He eventually ends up in the care of Jinnie Sue McAllister, a young country singer who lives in a camper van with her father, Luke, and their "manager", Cousin Jake. She, not knowing Gordy's name, calls him Pinky.

They travel to a dinner party, where Luke performs for the governor of Arkansas. Also there is rich businessman named Henry Royce; his daughter, Jessica; her rather dull but scheming fiancé, Gilbert Sipes; and her lonely young son, Hanky. Hanky wanders off on his own and meets Gordy and Jinnie Sue. He falls into the swimming pool, but can't swim. Just as Jinnie Sue rushes off to get help, Gordy dives into the pool with an inflatable tube, and saves Hanky. Due to his bravery, he is given to Hanky as a pet, and also becomes suddenly famous.

Henry and Gilbert have alternate decisions on who the new mascot of the Royce Company should be: Gordy or Jessica. In the end, Gordy wins, due to a switched camera lens used on Jessica's promotion. Gilbert is determined to remove Gordy and then take control of the company. He sends his henchmen, Dietz and Krugman, to kidnap Gordy, but he and Hanky escape by boarding a school bus, which Dietz and Krugman pursue. On the way, they are distracted briefly by a cross-dressing thief, and discover that Gordy and Hanky have escaped onto a feeding truck. They unexpectedly meet up with the McAllisters, who learn from the radio that Hanky has apparently run away. Another bulletin follows, revealing Henry has died of a heart attack. The McAllisters return Hanky and Gordy to the Royce building in St. Louis, Missouri where an attorney reveals Henry has left his company to them.

Cousin Jake, upon learning Gordy's family is missing, organizes a giant countrywide search to locate them and also a country music concert in Branson, Missouri in Gordy's name. Jim Stafford, Moe Bandy, Boxcar Willie, Cristy Lane, Buck Trent, and Mickey Gilley perform, as well as a surprise speech from President Bill Clinton (voiced by Jim Meskimen), who unveils a new stamp of Gordy. Gilbert sends Dietz and Krugman to kidnap Gordy, tie him in a sack, and toss him in a river, but he is saved by Cousin Jake, who returns him to Hanky and Jinnie Sue. Everyone learns from someone who calls into the telethon that his family is going to be slaughtered at an unidentified slaughterhouse in Nebraska. Gilbert tries to hide the fact that it's owned by the Royce family. However, a battle ensues between him and Luke, with Jessica and Luke knocking him out with the suitcase of Brinks, the family attorney. Gordy, Hanky, Jinnie Sue, Jessica, Luke, Cousin Jake, and Brinks race to stop the slaughterhouse from killing Gordy's family, but a train slows them down. Hanky successfully rings the lovestruck supervisor, and the slaughterhouse is shut down just in time. To Gordy's happiness, his family has survived, and he is reunited with his father, who was also about to be killed at the slaughterhouse. The pigs are moved back to the farm, which Luke and Jessica decide to buy with most of the Royce Company profits; they marry and Hanky, Jinnie Sue, and Cousin Jake move in too. Gordy and his family are finally reunited.

Cast 
 Doug Stone as Luke McAllister: A country singer, and the father of Jinnie Sue.
 Kristy Young as Jinnie Sue McAllister: The daughter of Luke, also a country singer.
 Tom Lester as Cousin Jake: Luke's cousin and the manager of his group.
 Deborah Hobart as Jessica Royce: the daughter of Henry and mother of Hanky, engaged to Gilbert.
 Michael Roescher as Hanky Royce: The lonely but friendly son of Jessica. He becomes a good friend to Gordy.
 James Donadio as Gilbert Sipes: The fiancé of Jessica and head of Market Research for the Royce company. He is a selfish and scheming man who is looking to take over it.
 Ted Manson as Henry Royce: The elderly executive of the Royce Company, father of Jessica, and grandfather of Hanky. He dies of a heart attack part-way through the film at age 73.
 Tom Key as Brinks: The comical friendly attorney of the Royce family and Gilbert. He usually follows the advice of his conscience.
 Jon Kohler and Afemo Omilami as Dietz and Krugman: Gilbert's incompetent henchmen.

Voices 
 Justin Garms as Gordy: A spunky young piglet who sets out from his home to find his missing family.
 Hamilton Camp as Gordy's Father: An adult pig who was taken up borth to be slaughtered. Camp also voices Richard the Rooster, who warns Gordy that his family has been taken away.
 Jocelyn Blue as Gordy's Mother: The mother of Gordy and his five siblings. She and Gordy's siblings are also taken for slaughter.
 Frank Welker as the Narrator and Animals' vocal effects
 Tress MacNeille as Wendy, Richard's mate
 Earl Boen as Minnesota Red
 Frank Soronow as Dorothy the Cow
 Billy Bodine as Piglet
 Blake McIver Ewing as Piglet
 Julianna Harris as Piglet
 Sabrina Weiner as Piglet
 Heather Bahler as Piglet
 Jim Meskimen as the voice of Bill Clinton

Production
The script for Gordy started under the title of Waldo and was written by veteran TV comedy writers Jay Sommers and Dick Chevillat with Arnold the Pig from Green Acres in mind for Waldo, but remained unproduced for several years.  In January 1993, it was announced Sybil Robson's newly formed  Robson Entertainment had acquired the Waldo script which was re-written by Leslie Stevens with the new title Gordy. Pre-production took place in Atlanta on a budget of $6-7 million.

Release 
The film was released on two screens in Tucson, Arizona on November 4, 1994 and was released nationwide on May 12, 1995.

Home media 
The film was released on VHS on November 8, 1995 by Walt Disney Home Video. It was released on DVD on June 4, 2002 by Walt Disney Home Entertainment, along with a simultaneous VHS re-release on the same day. It was re-released on DVD on April 12, 2011 by Echo Bridge Home Entertainment. A second re-release by Lionsgate was released on October 7, 2014, which includes a digital copy. A third re-release by Miramax was released on February 23, 2021.

Reception

Critical reception 
Along with generally negative reviews, the film was eclipsed by Babe, another family film about a talking piglet who becomes famous while avoiding being slaughtered for food. Review aggregation site Rotten Tomatoes gave it a 21% approval rating based on 19 reviews. Although it premiered on a limited release in Tucson in November 1994 and had its nationwide release a few months before Babe, it was far less successful critically and commercially. Meanwhile, Babe was both a critical and commercial success, won several awards (including an Academy Award for Visual Effects) and spawned a sequel titled Babe: Pig in the City.

Roger Ebert of the Chicago Sun-Times gave the film 2 out of 4 stars, writing: "This is not the kind of film that rewards deep analysis. I rate it at two stars, but I'd recommend it for kids. I can't recommend it for people like me, but there are many other kinds of people in the world, some of them children who believe that pigs can talk, and for them, Gordy is likely to be very entertaining. You know who you are."

Peter Stack of the San Francisco Chronicle claimed that "Gordy's strongest suit is the piglet's determination to reunite with his family, and that part of the convoluted plot develops into a folksy comic effort as Jinnie Sue, her dad, Hanky and Gordy race to save the family of pigs from becoming sausages. One would think the pork industry would be livid about this film as it portrays pig slaughter as an outrageous evil. The highlight comes when Gordy jumps into a backyard swimming pool—piglets really are cutest when they put their little trotters together and dive—and saves Hanky from drowning. Generally speaking, time would be better spent with Charlotte's Web than this forgettable hogwash."

Chris Hicks of the Deseret News reviewed the film saying that "This may have sounded like a cute idea on paper, but as kids pictures go this is the worst to come along in memory. Charmless, humorless and dull as drying paint, Gordy is the kind of movie parents should save for video punishment. But if they take their kids to a theater, they'll be punishing themselves."

Dave Kehr of the New York Daily News described the film as "a particularly dull and inept family film".

Caryn James of The New York Times opined that "It is possible that some children will be tickled at the very idea of a talking pig, even one as bland as Gordy. They will probably be children who have never seen any movie, ever. Gordy is the film that asks, How you gonna keep them down on the farm after they've seen Simba?"

Rita Kempley of the Washington Post called the film a "peculiar, seemingly pro-vegan tale". She later went on to say that "It's fairly obvious that Gordy's performance was inspired by Arnold Ziffel's precedent-setting work on the old TV series Green Acres. But then so was the movie, which was penned by series alumni Jay Sommers and Dick Chevillat. Their screenplay is as bland as an afternoon in Mister Rogers' Neighborhood, though the director, Australian animal-mockumentary-maker Mark Lewis, adds a touch of menace by using extreme close-ups, bizarre angles and other stylish camera work. One thing's for sure, Gordy will put little pea-pickers off their pork."

Walter V. Addiego of The Examiner Staff stated that "The film tosses a few mild, satirical darts at public relations and advertising, but otherwise it's strictly hokum from the heartland. The director, I'm sorry to say, is Mark Lewis, the Australian responsible for the strange and funny documentary Cane Toads: An Unnatural History, which enlivened the S.F. Film Festival in 1988. Gordy will not enhance his résumé. It's surprisingly amateurish, due in no small part to clumsy scripting by Leslie Stevens."

Tracy Moore of Common Sense Media gave the film two out of five stars, saying that "This fast-moving adventure about a talking pig's mission to find his family has a few fun elements -- some lively country music, a brush with fortune and fame, a bit of suspense, and lots of comically dodged mishaps. Kids will no doubt be entertained by the talking animals, cute pigs, and loads of adventure. Parents, however, should note the parent and child separation and the death of a grandparent as key concerns, as well as the scariness factor of the impending violence of the slaughterhouse, which is teased throughout the movie. If the audience is old enough to handle that potentially squeamish subject, Gordy is otherwise a passable 90 minutes of animal-talking antics." TV Guide gave the film 1½ stars out of four.

However, Louis Black of The Austin Chronicle wrote a favorable review of the film concluding that "A lot happens, it moves quickly, and the film is filled with minor characters who nicely round things out; my young companion watched the film from beginning to end, loving it. This is not a date movie."

Box office 
In its opening week in Tucson the film grossed $19,000. It went on to gross $3.9 million in the United States and Canada.

References

External links 

 
 
 

1994 comedy-drama films
1994 films
1990s adventure films
1990s American films
1990s English-language films
1994 fantasy films
1990s road movies
American children's comedy films
American children's drama films
American children's fantasy films
American comedy-drama films
American road movies
Children's comedy-drama films
Country music films
Films about children
Films about friendship
Films about pigs
Films set on farms
Films scored by Charles Fox
Films set in Arkansas
Films set in Missouri
Films set in Nebraska